Leman Cevat Tomsu (1913–1988) was a Turkish architect. Together with Münevver Belen, she was one of the first Turkish women to qualify as an architect when she graduated in 1934 from the Academy of Fine Arts, Istanbul. She was also the first women to teach architecture in Turkey. Later she became a professor at Istanbul Technical University.

Tomsu designed the Kayseri Theatre (Public House) after winning an architectural competition in 1937.

References

Architects from Istanbul
1913 births
1988 deaths
Academic staff of Istanbul Technical University